The plumeleteers are a genus Chalybura of Neotropical hummingbirds in the family Trochilidae.

The genus contains the following species:

References

Hummingbirds
Birds described in 1854
Bird genera
 
Taxonomy articles created by Polbot
Taxa named by Ludwig Reichenbach